Faulkner Creek is a  long 2nd order tributary to the Ararat River in Surry County, North Carolina.

Variant names
According to the Geographic Names Information System, it has also been known historically as:
Forkners Creek

Course
Faulkner Creek rises on the south side of Slate Mountain about 6 miles northeast of Mount Airy, North Carolina.  Faulkner Creek then flows southwest to join the Ararat River at Bannertown.

Watershed
Faulkner Creek drains  of area, receives about 48.0 in/year of precipitation, has a wetness index of 324.92, and is about 59% forested.

See also
List of rivers of North Carolina

References

Rivers of North Carolina
Rivers of Surry County, North Carolina